Henri Paternóster (9 January 1908 – 30 September 2007) was a Belgian Olympic fencer. He won a bronze medal in the team foil event at the 1948 Summer Olympics.

References

External links
 

1908 births
2007 deaths
Belgian male fencers
Belgian foil fencers
Olympic fencers of Belgium
Fencers at the 1936 Summer Olympics
Fencers at the 1948 Summer Olympics
Olympic bronze medalists for Belgium
Olympic medalists in fencing
People from Etterbeek
Medalists at the 1948 Summer Olympics
Sportspeople from Brussels